Quark/3 is a 1971 anthology of science fiction short stories and poetry edited by Samuel R. Delany and Marilyn Hacker. It is the third volume in the Quark series.  The stories and poems are original to this anthology.

Contents
 Continuous Landscape, by Donald Simpson
 Foreword, by Samuel R. Delany & Marilyn Hacker
 Continuous Landscape, by Donald Simpson
 "Encased in Ancient Rind", by R. A. Lafferty
 "Home Again, Home Again", by Gordon Eklund
 Continuous Landscape, by Donald Simpson
 "Dog in a Fisherman’s Net", by Samuel R. Delany
 Six Drawings, by Robert Lavigne
 "The Zanzibar Cat", by Joanna Russ
 "Field", by James Sallis
 "Vanishing Points", by Sonya Dorman
 "Where Have You Been, Billy Boy, Billy Boy?", by Kate Wilhelm
 "Brave Salt", by Richard Hill
 "Nature Boy", by Josephine Saxton
 Continuous Landscape, by Donald Simpson
 "Balls: A Meditation at the Graveside", by Virginia Kidd
 "Ring of Pain", by M. John Harrison
 "To the Child Whose Birth Will Change the Way the Universe Works", by George Stanley
 Continuous Landscape, by Donald Simpson
 "A Sexual Song", by Tom Veitch
 "Twenty-Four Letters from Under the Earth", by Hilary Bailey
 Six More Drawings, by Robert Lavigne
 "The Coded Sun Game", by Brian Vickers
 Continuous Landscape, by Donald Simpson
 Contributors’ Notes

References

1971 anthologies
Science fiction anthology series